The 2022 Oklahoma Sooners women's gymnastics team represented the University of Oklahoma during the 2021 NCAA Division I women's gymnastics. The Sooners were led by K.J. Kindler in her sixteenth season, and played their home meets at Lloyd Noble Center in Norman, Oklahoma. They competed in the Big 12 Conference, where they finished the season with a 31–2–0 record.

Oklahoma won their fifth national title with a score of 198.2000.

Schedule

Notes

Personnel

Coaching staff

Rankings

References 

2022 NCAA Division I women's gymnastics season
2022 in sports in Oklahoma